The Greeneyed Elephant is a 1960 Danish family film directed by Peter Guildbrassen and starring Dirch Passer. Two aspiring actresses stumble upon an ancient Aztec elephant sculpture that through the action of their best friend can be used to transfer their body into the other. Based on the novel Turnabout(1931) by Thorne Smith.

Cast
 Dirch Passer - Dennis
 Naura Hayden - Sally Fitzpatrik
 Delphi Lawrence - Lisa
 Ove Sprogøe - Tolderen
 Bjørn Watt-Boolsen - Tom
 Kirsten Passer - Mrs. Kelly
 Phil Baker - Arthur Croft
 Avi Sagild - Sekretær
 Grethe Sønck - Sangerinde
 Peer Guldbrandsen - Instruktøren / fortælleren (voice) (uncredited)
 Gitte Müller - Scriptgirl (uncredited)

External links

1960 films
1960s Danish-language films
Troma Entertainment films
Films directed by Peer Guldbrandsen
Films scored by Sven Gyldmark
Body swapping in films
Films produced by Sidney W. Pink